Surat Thani Futsal Club (Thai สโมสรฟุตซอลสุราษฎร์ธานี) is a Thai Futsal club, nicknamed The Lightning Shrimps and based in Surat Thani Province located in the south of Thailand. The club currently plays in the Thailand Futsal League.

Players

Current squad

External links 
 Surat Thani Futsal Club

Futsal clubs in Thailand
Surat Thani province
Futsal clubs established in 2007
2007 establishments in Thailand